Kourosh Yaghmaei ( also spelled as Kourosh Yaghmaee; born 3 December 1946) is an Iranian singer-songwriter, composer and record producer, who started his career in the early 1970s. Regarded as one of the greatest Persian psychedelic rock musicians in the history of Iranian rock music, he is known as "the Godfather of Iranian psychedelic rock", as well as "the king of rock".

Born in 1946 in Shahrud to Parsi parents, Yaghmaei later grew up in Tehran. Most of his songs combine classical Persian poetry with more contemptary works, often incorporating his own lyrics. Musically, Yaghmai is recognized as being an early cross-pollinator for Persian traditional music and the western psychedelic rock of the era, with artists Led Zeppelin and Pink Floyd often listed as specific influences. He began his solo career in 1973 with his first single "Gol-e Yakh" ("Ice Flower"), a track selling more than 5 million copies in the domestic market. This single was followed by the eponymous Gol-e Yakh (1973), which included the song. Much of Yaghmaei's work is well known by the Iranian diaspora, with singles "Gol-e Yakh", "Havar Havar" ("Shout Shout"), "Khaar" ("Thistle"), "Leila", "Paiz" ("Autumn"), "Reyhan" being particularly beloved. In 2011, his first compilation album, Back From the Brink: Pre-Revolution Psychedelic Rock From Iran: 1973-1979, was released by Now-Again Records to international recognition. Vogue has described Yaghmei as "psyche singer, stylish, moustached and funky". Following the 1979 Iranian Revolution, Yaghmaei's work was banned from the country's airways, markets and homes, and his name from the press.

Early life
Kourosh Yaghmaei was born on 3 December 1946 in Central District of Shahrud, Semnan, Iran to a well-off family. His name Kourosh ( Kūrauš; Kourosh) originated from the Persian Emperor Cyrus the Great (c. 600 – 530 BC). He is second son as a part of the Yaghmaei family. His elder brother Kamran Yaghmaei and younger brother Kambiz Yaghmaei are also musicians. His grandfather was a landowner and one of his distant ancestors was a popular Iranian poet. he family later relocated to Tehran, with Yaghmaei eventually studying at Shahid Beheshti University.

Yaghmaei began his interest in music at his age of ten. He started to learning Santur, an eastern instrument, which was bought by his father. Soon he learned to play and primarily followed by the traditional Iranian music. Later he self-learned to play guitar, at the age of fifteen, and became interested in Western music.

Music career

1960s–1970s

At a young age, he started his first band with some friends by listening to the vinyl records of bands like Surf-rockers and The Ventures. In the early 1960s, Yaghmaei joined a group named The Raptures who covers The Ventures, The Kinks, The Beatles, and The Monkees. In 1967 lineup of that group was Yaghmaei (lead vocal, guitar), Bahram Saeedi (electric guitar), Kamran Khasheh (organ), Jahangir (bass), Viguen (drums). He also played in another group named Rebels for a while, who later gradually took their places in Iranian rock scene.

In the early 1970s, at the age of early 20s, Yaghmaei set up his solo band along with his elder brother Kamran Yaghmaei and younger brother Kambiz Yaghmaei. That time he was playing guitar, bass and making vocals. His music consisted of combining Iranian melodies, instrumentals, vocals, and tones with Western harmonies, scales, and modes.

Gol-e Yakh

In 1973, Yaghmaei made his debut single when he was studying in Shahid Beheshti University in Tehran. The song "Gol-e Yakh" was written by Mahdi Akhavan Langeroudi who was Yaghmaei's friend at the university and one of the significant modern Persian poets. "Gol-e Yakh" penetrated beyond the borders of Iran, and thereafter various performances in other countries of the world continued till this day. The song brought a great fame to Yaghmaei and it was adapted for various languages. At the same year he released debut solo album Gol-e Yakh under Now-Again Records level, an American independent record label based in Los Angeles which is also a subsidiary of Stones Throw Records.

He released 4 singles from his contracted record company Ahange Rooz. In 1973 "Gole Yakh" / "Del Dareh Pir Misheh" and "Leila" / "Paiz", in 1974 "Hajme Khali" / "Akhm Nakon" and in 1975 "Saraabe Toe" / "Dar Enteha" was released. Despite the high sales from all these records he could only gain a modest royalty. He released two albums before being banned, both of which are important works of Iranian rock history. Between 1975 and 1979, Yaghmaei recorded 24 songs in total. 17 of those songs were collected in two albums named Hajm-e Khali (1975) and Sārāb-e Toe (1977) released in cassettes. The remaining 7 songs were recorded in the pre-revolution riot period between 1978 and 1979.

Islamic Revolution

Yaghmaei performed on radio or television in Iran till 1970s. During the Islamic Revolution of 1979, Islamic government cracked down hard on his music. Kourosh was no longer allowed to sing and perform publicly. This ban on Kourosh's performances would affect his career. Aside from a few concerts in Sweden and Norway in 1993, he did not perform much outside the country. The authorities swiftly shut down his music and barred from releasing records and performing live. Following the revolution, Yaghmaei spent over a month for recording albums Sol-e 1 (1979)- reissued on CD as Parandeye Mohajer by Los Angeles-based record label Caltex Records, Sol-e 2 (1980, recorded with Fereydoon Forooghi) and Sol-e 3, which was renamed to Arayesh-E Khorshid during its release in 2000, because during that time this album was about to be released the regime's pressure on music became more unbearable than ever. According to Kevan Harris, a lecturer from the University of California, the government after the Islamic revolution were too much motivated to stop the impacts of Western and European culture; therefore it was convinced to diminish musicians like Kourosh. Several musicians immigrated to cities like Los Angeles, Montreal, Paris and other European countries where exile communities were settled. Yaghmaei preferred to stay in Iran for his principles. Where he stated that:

Post revolution
After the Islamic Revolution, Yaghmaei was banned from performing for seventeen years. During that time he worked for children and published books and cassettes. In 1987, he released his fourth solo instrumental album Diar which was recorded without bass, guitar and drums, as dictated by the Iranian government. In addition, Yaghmaei arranged folkloric pieces to be played by the Great National Orchestra.

1990s–present

In the early 1990s, Yaghmaei got permission from the Iranian government to release albums under some restrictions. He released studio album Gorg haye Ghorosneh in 1990. Caltex Records titled his "best of the 1970s" as "Gole Yakh" released in 1991. During 1993, the restrictions became looser and Kourosh got permission to perform concerts in Norway and Sweden. In 1994 he released studio album Sib-e Noghreii (The Silver Apple), in which the regime didn't let him publish his portrait as an artwork, therefore album cover was only graphic arts. In 1996 Mah va Palang and in 1997 Kabous was released.

In the early 2000s, he released two solo albums Arayesh-E Khorshid (2000), which primarily recorded as Sol-e 3 was censored one track before released and Tofang-e daste Noghre (2001), was the last album that legally published in Iran.

Malek Jamshid

Between 2003 and 2006, Yaghmaei worked with his last studio album titled Malek Jamshid. After 12 years of trying to obtain the required permit from the Ministry of Culture and Islamic Guidance, the authority denied to release this album in Iran. Latter in 2016, since two years of restriction not to use types of equipment such as acoustic system, sound engineering, professional microphones, amplifiers, Roland keyboard, electric guitar, 8 track recorder and other necessary equipment the album was released by Now-Again in United States and the album was banned by the Iranian government.

He released debut compilation Back from the Brink: Pre-Revolution Psychedelic Rock from Iran: 1973–1979 in 2011. A two-disc celebration of Yaghmaei's most well-known numbers, recorded between 1973 and 1979, before the Islamic Revolution.

Musical style

Yaghmaei has unique Iranian style of psychedelic rock and blues-rock music. He brought a lot of innovation to Iranian rock, using the keyboard as the rhythm of the song instead of the guitar is part of this innovation. Such as describing a melancholic picture, blues riffs, strings and analog synthesizer sounds make a feeling that settles in the heart. As the songs last for 6 to 8 minutes approximately, many progressive movements could easily be a part of the music. According to Iranian writer Ebrahim Nabavi, "Yaghmaei has had a profound impact on Psychedelic rock in Iran." Yaghmaei is known as the father of Iranian rock music because of his deep influence on Iranian rock music. "He was one of the people who was doing the Western-Eastern kind of hybrid music the right way," says Ashkan Kooshanejad, a British-Iranian composer.

Personal life
Yaghmaei has two sons, Kaveh Yaghmaei, also a musician that lives in Vancouver, Canada; and Kamil Yaghmaei. He has a daughter named Satgin Yaghmaei. Due to his records being under heavy censorship in Iran, Kourosh now runs a private music school and studio in Tehran.

Discography

Studio albums
Gol-e Yakh (1973)
Hajm-e Khali (1975)
Sarab-e To (1977)
Diar (1987)
Gorg haye Ghorosneh (1990)
Sib-e Noghreii (The Silver Apple) (1994)
Mah va Palang (1996)
Parandeye Mohajer (1996)
Kabous (Nightmare) (1997)
Arayesh-E Khorshid (2000)
Tofang-e daste Noghre (2001)
Malek Jamshid (2016)

Live
Sol-e 1 (1979)
Sol-e 2 (1980)

Compilation
Back from the Brink: Pre-Revolution Psychedelic Rock from Iran: 1973–1979 (2011)
Happy Birthday (Joyful songs for Children) (2012)

Collaborative
50 Golden Songs of Giti, Afshin, Kourosh Yaghmaee & Fereydoon Farrokhzad – Persian Music (2004)

Singles

"Gol-e Yakh" / "Del Dareh Pir Misheh" ("My Heart is Getting Old") (1973)
"Khaar" ("Thistle") (1973)
"Leila" / "Paiz" ("Autumn") (1974)
"Sarab-e To" ("Your Mirage") / "Dar Enteha" ("At The End") (1977)
"Hajm-e Khali" ("Empty Bulk") (1975)
"Akhm Nakon" ("Don't Frown") (1975)
"Eshghe Iran" ("Iran's Love") (1977)
"Zadeye Mehr" ("Born to Kindness")(1997)
"Ghahre Afyoun" (2012)
"Vatan" ("Birth Country" "Iran") (2012)
"Faaje-e" ("Crisis") (2013)
"Kaabous" ("Nightmare") (1997)
"Nowrouz ("Iranian New Year)" (2016)
"Asmar Asmar" (2016)
"Pedar" ("Father")
"Shabe Yalda" ("Longest night of the year")
"Nedamatgah" ("Jail")
"Panjerei Roo Be Sobh" ("A Window Opens Toward Morning") 
"Marde Khakestari" ("A Gray Man" aka "Old Man")

Film score
Kourosh Yaghmaei also composed several film scores, starting in 1991, with Gorghaye Gorosneh.

In popular culture
Vice Principals is an American comedy television series which in season 1, episode 4 called "Run for the Money" when Gamby and Russell experience Psychedelic drugs on themselves when Russell tried to sabotage the football game, the background music plays the song "Entezar”. The song "Sarab-e To" can also be heard in the 2014 American horror comedy film Summer of Blood.

Yaghmaei's song featured on several albums by various artists. His 1974 single "Gol-e Yakh" about disappearing youth appeared originally as "Adam and Eve" on 2018 albums Nasir by American rapper Nas.

In 1989, Bollywood song "Haa Bhai Haa Mai Hu Jawaan" performed by Anuradha Paudwal and Amit Kumar from the film Toofan directed by Ketan Desai was inspired from Yaghmaei's song "Havar Havar". Pakistani singer Hasan Jahangir had copied to come out with "Hava Hava" in his album "Hava Hava". This song was remade in a Hindi movie Aag Ka Gola as "Aaya Aaya Woh Aaya Yaar Mera Aaya Re" by music composer Bappi Lahiri. This song was also remade in another Hindi movie Billoo Badshah as "Jawan Jawan Ishq Jawan Hai" by music composer Jagjit Singh.

Gol-e Yakh was also featured in "The Rock" episode of the Apple TV+ series "Little America", which focused on the immigrant life of an Iranian family living in New York.

See also
List of Iranian musicians

References

Cite

External links

Living people
1946 births
20th-century Iranian male singers
20th-century guitarists
Persian-language singers
Iranian singer-songwriters
Iranian songwriters
Iranian male singers
Iranian rock singers
Iranian rock musicians
Iranian composers
Iranian record producers
Iranian rock bass guitarists
Iranian music arrangers
Psychedelic rock musicians
Male bass guitarists
Rhythm guitarists
Stones Throw Records artists
Caltex Records artists
Musicians from Tehran
People from Shahrud, Iran
People from Semnan Province
Shahid Beheshti University alumni
Now-Again Records artists